Phytoecia rufipes is a species of beetle in the family Cerambycidae. It was described by Olivier in 1795. It has a wide distribution in Europe and the Middle East. It feeds on Foeniculum vulgare.

Subspecies
 Phytoecia rufipes latior Pic, 1895
 Phytoecia rufipes bangi Pic, 1901
 Phytoecia rufipes rufipes (Olivier, 1795)

References

Phytoecia
Beetles described in 1795